Girls Always Happy is a 2018 Chinese drama film directed by Yang Mingming. It was screened in the Panorama section at the 68th Berlin International Film Festival.

Cast
 Li Qinqin
 An Nai
 Zhang Xianmin

References

External links
 

2018 films
2018 drama films
Chinese drama films
Chinese-language films